Stellaris may refer to:

Entertainment
 Stellaris (video game), a 2016 video game developed by Paradox Development Studio
 Stellaris Casino, a casino in Puerto Rico, part of the San Juan Marriott Resort & Stellaris Casino
 Stellaris Casino, a casino in Aruba, part of the Aruba Marriott Resort & Stellaris Casino

Science
Stellaris, a vitrectomy system developed by Bausch & Lomb
 Stellaris RNA FISH, a type of fluorescence in situ hybridization

Species
 Stellaris autumnalis or Prospero autumnale, an autumnal flowering plant
 Stellaris bohemica or Gagea bohemica, a European and Mediterranean species of flowering plant 
 Stellaris soleirolii or Gagea soleirolii, a European flowering plant
 Botaurus stellaris or Eurasian bittern, a species of wading bird
 Brodiaea stellaris, a species of flowering plant in the cluster-lily genus
 Cyclocarpa stellaris,  a species of flowering plant in the legume family, Fabaceae
 Hibbertia stellaris, a brilliantly orange flowering ground cover
 Phacelia stellaris, a rare species of flowering plant in the borage family
 Sabatia stellaris, an annual plant
 Saxifraga stellaris, a synonym of Micranthes stellaris, an Arctic–alpine species
 Utricularia stellaris, a medium to large sized suspended aquatic carnivorous plant

Other
 Stellaris, an ARM Cortex-M3 based 32-bit MCU family from Texas Instruments

See also
Stellar (disambiguation)